Jonas Fredrik Sandqvist (born 6 May 1981) is a Swedish former professional footballer who played as a goalkeeper. He played mainly for Landskrona BoIS and Malmö FF during a career that spanned between 1998 and 2016. He won one cap for the Sweden national team in 2005.

Club career
Sandqvist began his career at Landskrona BoIS where he got a big breakthrough during the 2004 season in Allsvenskan. After the 2005 season, he left the club for the rivals Malmö FF and he rescued the team in many games, as the defence was leaking. After expressing his intent to leave the club as bosman, Malmö FF bought Johan Dahlin as new first goalkeeper and as Sandqvist failed to find a new club he sat on the bench for the rest of the 2009 season. On December 16, 2009 Atromitos F.C. agreed terms with Sandqvist for 2.5 years, starting on 1 January 2010. Sandqvist stayed on the bench for 2010, had no chances in Atromitos and on 7 December 2010 he was released from his contract. Sandqvist had a trial with Championship side Middlesbrough and was asked to stay longer but instead accepted a contract from Aalesunds FK. He had his first European level game for Aalesunds FK against Neath in the first qualifying round of the Europa League. Aalesunds FK won 4–1. On November 14, 2011 he signed a multiple year-contract with the Swedish club Örebro SK. He also played for Icelandic Keflavík before returning to Landskrona BoIS.

International career 
Sandqvist made his only Sweden U21 appearance on 2 June 2004 at the 2004 UEFA European Under-21 Championship in a 3–1 group stage game against Switzerland.

He made his full international debut for Sweden on 26 January 2005, keeping a clean sheet in a friendly game against Mexico as Sweden drew the Mexicans 0–0.

External links
Malmö FF Profile
fotbolltransfers.com

References

1981 births
Living people
Association football goalkeepers
Swedish footballers
Sweden international footballers
Sweden under-21 international footballers
Landskrona BoIS players
Malmö FF players
Atromitos F.C. players
Aalesunds FK players
Örebro SK players
Allsvenskan players
Super League Greece players
Swedish expatriate footballers
Expatriate footballers in Greece
Expatriate footballers in Norway
Knattspyrnudeild Keflavík players